Symmetric In Design is the debut album by Swedish metal band Scar Symmetry. Symmetric In Design was recorded during July through September 2004 at Black Lounge Studios, Avesta, Sweden. Symmetric In Design was released on February 7, 2005 in Europe, September 6, 2005 in the United States and April 25, 2005 in Japan.

Track listing
All lyrics written by Henrik Ohlsson.

Credits

Scar Symmetry
 Christian Älvestam – vocals
 Jonas Kjellgren – rhythm guitar, keyboards, mixing, engineering
 Per Nilsson – lead guitar, keyboards, engineering
 Henrik Ohlsson – drums
 Kenneth Seil – bass guitar

Other personnel
Thomas Johansson	– mastering
Pär Johansson	– artwork, layout, logo
John Allan – photography

Release history

References

External links
 Official Website

Scar Symmetry albums
Nuclear Blast albums
2005 debut albums